Tom Greggs FRSE is a British theologian and the Marischal Professor of Divinity at the University of Aberdeen.

Early life and education

Greggs was born and raised in Liverpool, where he was educated at Liverpool Blue Coat School. During his time there, he was head of school and now serves as a foundation guardian. In 1999 he entered Christ Church, Oxford, where he studied theology as an Open Scholar and graduated with the highest first class honours in his year for which he was awarded the Denyer and Johnson Prize. Before beginning his doctoral work, Greggs taught religion and philosophy at the Manchester Grammar School. He completed his PhD in Systematic Theology in 2007 at Jesus College, Cambridge under the supervision of David Ford. His doctoral dissertation served as the basis for his 2009 book Barth, Origen, and Universal Salvation: Restoring Particularity.

Academic career

Greggs has taught at the University of Cambridge, and served as senior lecturer in Christian Doctrine at the University of Chester. At the age of 29, he became Chester University's youngest ever professor and was appointed to a chair in systematic theology. At that time, he was the youngest professor in the UK. He moved to the University of Aberdeen in 2011 to take the post of Professor in Historical and Doctrinal Theology. He was translated to the Marischal Chair in 2016. The Marischal Chair is the oldest separate Chair of Divinity at the University of Aberdeen and was founded in Marischal College in 1616, although the Divinity School is now located in King's College in Old Aberdeen. He is also Honorary Professor of Theology at St Mellitus College, London, and a founding member to the Royal Society of Edinburgh Young Academy of Scotland. In 2019 he was elected a Fellow of the Royal Society of Edinburgh.

During his career, Greggs has also served as a visiting research fellow at St John's College, Durham, and as the College of Arts and Sciences International Visiting Scholar and Visiting Professor in Religion at the University of Virginia.  He has served as secretary of Society for the Study of Theology, and as co-chair of the Scriptural Reasoning panel for the American Academy of Religion. He is the editor of Brill's Companions to Modern Theology series and co-editor of the Edinburgh University Press Critical History of Theology series. He is also on the editorial board of The Journal of Scriptural Reasoning (University of Virginia) and a consulting editor for the Encountering Traditions series published by Stanford University.

Ecclesiastical work

Greggs is a local preacher in the Methodist Church and has also preached internationally as well as appearing on radio. He was the 2014 Fernley-Hartley Lecturer for the Methodist Church, and gave the 2014 Conference Lecture for the Methodist Church on the impact of doctrine on the life and ministry of the church.  He serves on the World Council of Churches Faith and Order Commission and convenes the subgroup considering religious pluralism for Faith and Order.  He also serves on the Faith and Order Commission of the Methodist Church.

Research and publications
Greggs's research and writing has focused on salvation, the doctrine of God, evangelical theology, theologies of the religions, and inter-faith issues. He has published over 50 essays in theology journals including International Journal of Systematic Theology, Modern Theology, Journal of Religion, Scottish Journal of Theology, International Journal of Public Theology, Theology, and Epworth Review. His books include:

)

References

Academics of the University of Aberdeen
Academics of the University of Chester
English Christian theologians
Methodist theologians
21st-century Protestant theologians
Alumni of Jesus College, Cambridge
Alumni of Christ Church, Oxford
Academics from Liverpool
Living people
1980 births